Kathleen O'Connor (30 July 1934 – 13 December 2017) was an Irish Clann na Poblachta politician who served as a Teachta Dála (TD) for the Kerry North constituency from 1956 to 1957.

In 1954, her father Johnny Connor had been elected to the Dáil on his third attempt as a candidate for Clann na Poblachta. During her father's stint as a TD, she had also been in Dublin training to become a National School teacher, at Carysfort College and she taught at Meen National School, Knocknagoshel. During her spare time she would offer work at her father's office as his de facto secretary and thus was familiar with the ins and outs of his job. Tragedy struck in December 1955, when Johnny Connor was killed in a traffic accident as he was returning to his home in County Kerry.

Following the funeral, Seán MacBride, leader of Clann na Poblachta, asked O'Connor's mother, Margaret, to stand in the forthcoming by-election for her husband's seat. When she refused, MacBride turned to O'Connor and pleaded with her to stand, saying that she was Clann na Poblachta's only hope for survival, as the party's fortunes had greatly soured after the first Inter-Party Government of 1951. Also, the loss of her father's seat to a Fianna Fáil candidate could have caused the collapse of the Government of the 15th Dáil, which held only a small majority of seats.

The by-election for his Dáil seat was held on 29 February 1956. All of the parties that were members of the government (Fine Gael, Labour, and Clann na Talmhan) agreed not to run candidates as a means to bolster O'Connor, and on top of this the leaders of all three parties (John A. Costello, William Norton, Joseph Blowick) visited the constituency during the campaign. In response, Fianna Fáil also brought in party members to campaign and the Taoiseach Éamon de Valera. It all ended with a victory for O'Connor, then only 21-years-old. She became the youngest TD ever at that time and was in fact so young she was still not registered to vote.

She did not stand at the 1957 general election, and retired from politics. She was 21 years, 7 months old when elected, making her the fourth youngest ever person elected to the Dáil. She was the first woman to succeed her father at a by-election to Dáil Éireann and the first woman elected to the Dáil in the Kerry North constituency.

See also
Families in the Oireachtas

References

1934 births
2017 deaths
Clann na Poblachta TDs
Irish schoolteachers
Members of the 15th Dáil
20th-century women Teachtaí Dála
Politicians from County Kerry
Alumni of Carysfort College